The Night of the Arts is an annual event held in several major cities in Finland, usually in August. E.g. in 2019: Helsinki, Turku and Oulu 15 August; Tampere and Vaasa 8 August.  It is one of many White Night festivals held worldwide.

The Night of the arts is an art festival, where art-related events happen in various places all around the city. The events typically begin at around 6 to 8 PM and last at least until midnight, sometimes even to early morning. Events are held in museums, bookstores, public parks and other places.

The event has received criticism because of increased use of alcoholic beverages in public late at night. Because of this, a derogatory nickname for the event is the "Night of the bottles" (Pullojen yö).

Katutaiteiden yö
In recent years there has been a sort of a counter-event called Katutaiteiden yö ("Street arts night") that concentrated around graffiti in its different forms. To date, the events have only taken place in Helsinki, whilst in other cities, graffiti happenings are a regular part of the official event.

External links

Official website

Festivals in Finland
Arts festivals in Finland
August events
Recurring events established in 1989
Festivals established in 1989
Street art festivals
Summer events in Finland